Antonio Jakoliš (born 28 February 1992) is a Croatian professional footballer who plays as a winger for Romanian Liga I side FC Argeș Pitești. His brother, Marin, is also a professional footballer.

Club career
In January 2012, Jakoliš terminated his contract with Šibenik through arbitration and signed with Dnipro Dnipropetrovsk the following month. He was loaned to Kryvbas Kryvyi Rih and made his debut for the first team as a second-half substitute in a 2–0 defeat against Zorya Luhansk on 16 March 2012.

His Kryvbas, and indeed Dnipro Dnipropetrovsk career, was short lived, as he signed a three and a half year contract with HNK Hajduk Split in December 2012, effective January 2013. Dnipro received no compensation as a part of the transfer. In his first interview as a Hajduk player, Antonio stated that "Sibenik is the club where I started my career and the one I will always support, but Hajduk, the club with the best fans in Croatia, are the best choice for me."

In June 2013 his contract with Hajduk Split was terminated and he signed for Belgian club Mouscron-Péruwelz.

On 2 October 2020, he signed a three-year contract with Panetolikos.

Career statistics

Club
As of 11 March 2023

Honours

Club
 Šibenik
Croatian Cup runner-up: 2009–10
Hajduk Split
Croatian Cup: 2012–13
Croatian Super Cup runner-up: 2013
CFR Cluj
Cupa României: 2015–16
Supercupa României: 2016
Apollon Limassol
Cypriot Super Cup: 2017 
Cypriot Cup runner-up: 2017–18
APOEL
Cypriot First Division: 2018–19
Cypriot Cup runner-up: 2018–19
Cypriot Super Cup: 2019

References

External links

Antonio Jakoliš at FC Kryvbas official website 

1992 births
Living people
People from Varaždin
Association football wingers
Croatian footballers
Croatia under-21 international footballers
Croatia youth international footballers
HNK Šibenik players
FC Dnipro players
FC Kryvbas Kryvyi Rih players
HNK Hajduk Split players
Royal Excel Mouscron players
NK Zadar players
CFR Cluj players
FC Steaua București players
Apollon Limassol FC players
APOEL FC players
Panetolikos F.C. players
FC Argeș Pitești players
Croatian Football League players
Ukrainian Premier League players
Belgian Pro League players
Liga I players
Cypriot First Division players
Super League Greece players
Croatian expatriate footballers
Expatriate footballers in Ukraine
Croatian expatriate sportspeople in Ukraine
Expatriate footballers in Belgium
Croatian expatriate sportspeople in Belgium
Expatriate footballers in Romania
Croatian expatriate sportspeople in Romania
Expatriate footballers in Cyprus
Croatian expatriate sportspeople in Cyprus
Expatriate footballers in Greece
Croatian expatriate sportspeople in Greece